Julia Wu is a right-handed table tennis player from New Zealand who has represented New Zealand and Oceania in a number of international championships, including the 2010 Summer Youth Olympics held in Singapore and the 2015 Summer Universiade in Gwangju. She plays with a shakehand grip. In the 2009 ASB Young Sports Person of the Year Awards, Wu was a finalist in the Girls Table Tennis section.

Sporting career 

Wu was professionally trained in Auckland, where she was part of the high performance programme within the Auckland Table Tennis Association.

When asked about representing New Zealand, she replied: "It means a lot – I would've never thought that I would have made it but I did, so I am extremely happy to be part of the team."

Competitions 
 2008 Oceania Table Tennis Championships
 2008 Tahiti Junior Open
 2008 New Zealand Summer Nationals
 U15 Girls' Singles – 1st
 U15 Girls' Doubles – 1st (with Angie Guo)
 U15 Mixed Doubles – 2nd (with Brad Storer)
 2008 World Junior Table Tennis Championships
 2009 ITTF Cadet Challenge & ITTF Junior Circuit Finals
 2010 Oceania Youth Olympic Games Qualification Event
 2010 Oceania Table Tennis Championships
 Individual Events
 U21 Women's Doubles – 3rd
 U18 Girls' Singles – 3rd
 U18 Girls' Doubles – 3rd (with Jennifer Tseng; tied with Natalie Paterson/Sophia Dong)
 Team Events
 U18 Girls' Team – 2nd (with Jennifer Tseng and Natalie Paterson)
 2010 Youth Olympic Games
 Played Women's Singles and Mixed Team
 2010 New Zealand Junior & Cadet Open – ITTF Junior Circuit
 Cadet Girls' Doubles – 1st (with Angie Guo)
2015 Summer Universiade
Played Women's Singles, Women's Doubles, Women's Team, and Mixed Doubles

Personal life 

Wu is an avid guitar and bass player.

See also 
 Kevin Wu
 Table tennis at the 2010 Summer Youth Olympics

References 

Table tennis players at the 2010 Summer Youth Olympics
New Zealand female table tennis players
Year of birth missing (living people)
Living people
Table tennis players from Jiangsu
Sportspeople from Nanjing
Naturalised table tennis players